Berk İsmail Ünsal (born 6 August 1994) is a Turkish footballer who plays as a striker for Esenler Erokspor.

Club career

Galatasaray

Ünsal started his professional career at Galatasaray, where he trained. On 29 March 2014, he played his first Süper Lig match for Cim-Bom, against Torku Konyaspor, where he stayed on the pitch almost 28 minutes and replaced for his teammate Umut Bulut in the 62nd minute. The match was a 0–0 draw. His second Süper Lig match was against Kasımpaşa, where Galatasaray was defeated. He was in the first XI, played 49 minutes on the pitch, and Yekta Kurtuluş replaced instead of him for tactical changing. The match ended in a 0–4 loss for Gala. On 27 April 2014, Ünsal replaced instead of Yekta Kurtuluş in 87th minute and played almost 2 or 3 minutes against Elazığspor, where Cim-Bom won 0–1.

Career statistics
()

Honours
Galatasaray
Türkiye Kupası: 2013–14

References

External links
 
 
 

1994 births
People from Gaziosmanpaşa
Footballers from Istanbul
Living people
Turkish footballers
Turkey youth international footballers
Association football forwards
Galatasaray S.K. footballers
Antalyaspor footballers
Giresunspor footballers
Gümüşhanespor footballers
Sakaryaspor footballers
Süper Lig players
TFF First League players
TFF Second League players
Mediterranean Games silver medalists for Turkey
Mediterranean Games medalists in football
Competitors at the 2013 Mediterranean Games